The 1995 Syracuse Orangemen football team competed in football on behalf of Syracuse University during the 1995 NCAA Division I-A football season. The Orangemen were coached by Paul Pasqualoni and played their home games at the Carrier Dome in Syracuse, New York.

Schedule

Schedule Source:

Game summaries

North Carolina

East Carolina

Minnesota

Rutgers

Temple

Eastern Michigan

West Virginia

Virginia Tech

Pitt

Boston College

Miami (FL)

1996 Gator Bowl

References

Syracuse
Syracuse Orange football seasons
Gator Bowl champion seasons
Syracuse Orangemen football